Grigor Dimitrov was the defending champion, but did not complete in the Juniors this year.

Andrey Kuznetsov defeated Jordan Cox in the final, 4—6, 6–2, 6–2 to win the boys' singles tennis title at the 2009 Wimbledon Championships.

Seeds

  Daniel Berta (third round)
  Huang Liang-chi (first round)
  Bernard Tomic (semifinals)
  Agustín Velotti (quarterfinals)
  Andrea Collarini (first round)
  Gianni Mina (second round)
  Shuichi Sekiguchi (first round)
  Julen Urigüen (first round)
  Dominik Schulz (quarterfinals)
  Julien Obry (second round)
  David Souto (second round)
  Denis Kudla (first round)
  Hsieh Cheng-peng (second round)
  Facundo Argüello (first round)
  Tennys Sandgren (second round)
  Evan King (first round)

Draw

Finals

Top half

Section 1

Section 2

Bottom half

Section 3

Section 4

References

External links

Boys' Singles
Wimbledon Championship by year – Boys' singles